Bostaneh or Bastaneh may refer to:
 Bostaneh, Fars
 Bostaneh, Hormozgan
 Bostaneh, Parsian, Hormozgan Provionce